The men's 10,000 metres long distance event at the 1960 Olympic Games took place on September 8.  The event was held in a final only format.

Results

Final

Key: OR = Olympic record; DNF = did not finish

References

M
10,000 metres at the Olympics
Men's events at the 1960 Summer Olympics